Dyer Bay is a bay in Steuben, Maine.

It is separated from Pigeon Hill Bay to the east by Petit Manan Point, and from Gouldsboro Bay to the west by Dyer Neck.
The bay extends roughly 6 mi. (10 km) and is 1 mi. (2 km) at its widest.

External links
  Maine Coast Guides: Dyer Bay

Bays of Washington County, Maine
Bays of Maine